Martin Bro Johansen (born 22 July 1972 in Glostrup) is a Danish former football (soccer) player. He played usually as a midfielder but could also play as a forward. During his career he played for FC Copenhagen, B 1903 and most notably Coventry City in the FA Premier League.

Johansen appeared once for the Danish national team in his career. His twin brother Michael Johansen was also a professional footballer.

References

External links
Danish national team profile

1972 births
Living people
People from Glostrup Municipality
Danish men's footballers
Kjøbenhavns Boldklub players
F.C. Copenhagen players
Coventry City F.C. players
FC Nordsjælland players
Lyngby Boldklub players
Premier League players
Expatriate footballers in England
Danish Superliga players
Denmark international footballers
Denmark under-21 international footballers
Danish expatriate men's footballers
Danish twins
Twin sportspeople
Association football midfielders
Association football forwards
Denmark youth international footballers
Sportspeople from the Capital Region of Denmark